The Fenghuoshan Tunnel is the highest railway tunnel in the world. It is 1,338 metres (4,390 feet) long, and stands 4,905 meters (16,093 feet) above sea level. It is part of the Qinghai–Tibet Railway, linking Qinghai and Tibet that was completed in 2006.

The tunnel is located in the western, sparsely populated Zadoi County, Qinghai (the eastern edge of the Hoh Xil mountainous region between the Kunlun and Tanggula mountain ranges).

Notes

Further reading

External links

Railway tunnels in Qinghai
Articles containing video clips